"Greatest Love" is a song by American singer-songwriter  Ciara released on February 12, 2019, by Beauty Marks Entertainment.

The track was written and produced by regular collaborators, Theron Thomas, who previously worked on Ciara and Jackie, and Jasper Cameron, who has been working with Ciara since her debut album Goodies (2004).

Composition
The song lasts for 3 minutes and 43 seconds and has a slower tempo compared to previously released singles "Level Up", "Freak Me" and "Dose". It has been described as having a grinding R&B groove punctuated by heavy bass and layered with waves of airy synths.

Music video
The music video was released the same day as the song.

Track listing
Digital download
"Greatest Love" – 3:43

Charts

References

2019 singles
2019 songs
Ciara songs
Songs written by Ciara
Songs written by Theron Thomas
Songs written by Jasper Cameron
Beauty Marks Entertainment singles
Song recordings produced by Ciara